is a Japanese role-playing video game developed by f4samurai for Android and iOS, which was released by Aniplex in Japan on August 22, 2017. A North American version was available from June 2019 to October 2020. The game is a spin-off of the 2011 anime series Puella Magi Madoka Magica, and features a new protagonist named Iroha Tamaki, who arrives in Kamihama City to search for her missing sister.

A manga adaptation has been serialized in Manga Time Kirara Forward magazine since August 24, 2018, illustrated by Fujino Fuji. A stage play adaptation was also produced in 2018. An anime television series adaptation of the game produced by Shaft aired between January and March 2020. A second season aired between August and September 2021, and a third and final season aired in April 2022.

Plot

Two story arcs have been released for Magia Record video game. The first arc consists of two parallel storylines; the Main Story which revolves around Iroha and her dealings with the uwasa and the Magius, and the Another Story, a side story of the unfolding events in Kamihama City from the perspective of the main characters of the original Puella Magi Madoka Magica anime. The second arc covers events after the resolution of the conflict with the Magius where Iroha deals with the kimochi, another phenomenon distinct from uwasa or the witches.

Arc 1
A white creature named Kyubey has the power to grant girls any single wish. In exchange for that wish, however, they must become magical girls and fight against creatures known as Witches. A rumor soon begins to spread among magical girls that they can be saved from their duty by going to Kamihama City.

Iroha Tamaki, a girl who had originally forgotten the wish she made to become a magical girl encounters a smaller Kyubey one day and remembers that she made a wish to cure her younger sister Ui of her illness. Realising that all evidence of Ui's existence has disappeared, Iroha travels to Kamihama City in order to find answers, where she meets with Yachiyo Nanami, a veteran magical girl. Uncertain on how to proceed in finding her sister, Iroha decides to investigate rumors on a hunch that it might give clues to her sister's whereabouts. She learns that these rumors manifest into  uwasa, creatures which resemble witches and also have their own labyrinths. Iroha gradually manages to establish her own group of magical girls which consists of Yachiyo Nanami, Tsuruno Yui, Felicia Mitsuki, Sana Futaba, and herself. However Iroha and her group conflict with the Magius, a mysterious organization of magical girls which advocates for the "salvation" of magical girls and who are bent on protecting the uwasa. The Magius is led by Alina Gray, Nemu Hiiragi, and Touka Satomi; the latter two of whom were Ui's close friends, but who now no longer have any memories of her.

With Iroha and her group managing to take down several uwasa across Kamihama City, the Magius takes drastic measures. Mifuyu, a senior member and former long-time friend of Yachiyo, orchestrates a plan to convince Iroha's group to join the Magius. She invites Iroha's group to a lecture where they are informed about the true nature of magical girls; that their soul gems are directly linked to their own lives, and that they are fated to become witches themselves. Mifuyu also informs them that Magius created the doppel system which essentially circumvents their cruel fate. However this system is only in place in Kamihama City, with the group planning to extend this to the whole world. Iroha disagrees with the group's extreme methods and refuses to join the Magius, but Felicia, Tsuruno, and Sana are brainwashed into joining. Yachiyo, who didn't attend the lecture, but who was long aware of the truth of magical girls, relents after finding out that Iroha's group was essentially dissolved by Mifuyu's actions. Iroha convinces Yachiyo to regain her resolve to help her win back their former comrades.

The Magius leaders decide to resort to more extreme methods, which involve brainwashing its own members, causing the defection of the disillusioned Mifuyu who covertly dispels Felicia and Sana's brainwashing. Tsuruno is fused to an uwasa. The brainwashing of Tsuruno with an uwasa causes them to indiscriminately lure in and harvest energy from any Non-Magius person it can. Iroha's group manages to reverse Tsuruno's condition and meets up with Mitama Yakumo and makes a plan to gather all of the city's magical girls at her place for their safety.

Kamihama's magical girls go to the Magius' headquarters, which is inside an uwasa'''s labyrinth to fight against the group head on. They learn that the Magius plans to lure Walpurgisnacht, an infamous colossal witch, to Kamihama City and have it fight against a creation of its own which the group names "Eve" in order to gather enough energy to expand the doppel system, potentially endangering the city's populace. Iroha learns that Eve and Ui are one and the same, and eventually manages to convince Nemu and Touka of Ui's existence. Alina proceeds to release Eve to Kamihama City as originally planned. Meanwhile, Kamihama's magical girls regroup at the city center to stop both Eve and Walpurgisnacht, but not before the two cause widespread destruction. Iroha successfully reverts Ui back to her normal form and the Walpurgisnacht is finished off by a combined attack by Yachiyo and Iroha.

Arc 2
The magical girls of Kamihama City forms an alliance called the Kamihama Union. Meanwhile Iroha deals with the kimochi, a new kind of creature distinct from uwasa and witches. The Promise Blood, another group of magical girls from outside the city come to Kamihama to exact their grievances. The remnants of the Magius also regroup as the Neo Magius.

GameplayMagia Record is a turn-based tactical RPG that features battles with magical girls on the right side of the screen and witches/familiars on the left side. The player must attack enemies on the left side with magical girls that they have collected and chosen onto their team by choosing three of five attack disks found at the bottom of the screen. There are three types of attacks that the player can use: "Accele", which boosts Magic Points (MP); "Blast", which can target multiple enemies in a row or column; and "Charge", which boosts the impact of the attack following it. Attacks are automatically boosted if all three disks chosen are of the same type of command or are from the same character. After a magical girl attacks three times, the player can use an attack disk associated with that character and drag it to another magical girl on their team to "Connect" and add special effects on the receiving character, such as healing them. Magical girls are also able to use skills (found at the bottom right of the screen) and "Magia" (bottom left of the screen).

The game's main story is separated by chapters, which are further separated into episodes. Once an episode is completed, the player receives rewards, experience points for each magical girl in the team, and rank points from the battle and can replay the episode as well as move on to the next. If the player loses a battle in an episode, they can continue by using Magia Stones, one of the in-game currencies. One magical girl is automatically put onto a team, but the player can select up to three additional magical girls and a support girl, which can be received from the game's Fate Weave feature. The Fate Weave feature can also be used to gain Memoria.  Completing Side Missions will reward the player with materials to enhance their magical girls or currency to purchase said material.

Development and release
The game was officially announced at the Shaft 40th anniversary "Madogatari" event in September 2016. The producer of the original anime series, Atsuhiro Iwakami stated, "Since it seems that it will take some more time until the anime's new work, the idea that I want to make a title that "Madoka Magica" is active will work. Ume Aoki, the character designer of the original anime series was also responsible for the game's character designs, in which she designed more than 10 new and original characters for the game, including the main protagonist Iroha Tamaki. The opening animation and magical girl transformation scenes was produced by Shaft. The game is produced by Yusuke Toyama and Masaki Sato.Magia Record was originally scheduled to be released in May 2017. However, it was pushed back to July and then again to its current release date, August 22, 2017. Aniplex of America produced an English version of Magia Record that was released in North America on June 25, 2019. A pre-registration campaign was held for its release, where at least 25,000 people pre-registered for the English release of the game. On August 28, 2020, it was announced that the North American version of the game would be shutting down at the end of the following month. The news was responded to negatively, with refunds for any microtransactions being refused. This was preceded by poor communication among the developers and players, alongside constant banners, which encouraged spending money. The end of service was later delayed to October 30 and a gallery mode update was made available to players who updated the app before the shutdown.

Other media
Manga

A manga adaptation based on Magia Record illustrated by Fujino Fuji has been serialized in Manga Time Kirara Forward'' magazine since August 24, 2018. Yen Press is publishing the series in English.

Stage play
The game also inspired a stage play adaptation that was produced from August 24 to September 9, 2018. The characters were portrayed by the Japanese idol group girl Hiragana Keyakizaka46. The Blu-ray and DVD for the stage adaptation was released on February 27, 2019.

Anime

An anime television series adaptation by Shaft was announced in September 2018 and was originally scheduled to premiere in 2019, but it was delayed, instead airing between January 4 and March 28, 2020 on Tokyo MX, GYT, GTV, BS11, and MBS. The series is directed and written by Doroinu of Gekidan Inu Curry, with Yukihiro Miyamoto serving as assistant director, Junichirō Taniguchi serving as character designer, and Takumi Ozawa composing the series' music. Akiyuki Shinbo serves as animation supervisor. The cast reprise their roles from the game. TrySail performed the series' opening theme song , while ClariS performed the series' ending theme song . Aniplex of America has licensed the series, and began streaming the series on FunimationNow and AnimeLab from January 4, and on Crunchyroll and Hidive from January 11. In Southeast Asia, Plus Media Networks Asia aired a simulcast on Aniplus Asia. The first season ran for 13 episodes, with a second season announced at the end of the first season's final episode. In Italy, the series was simulcast on VVVVID.

The second season, titled , aired from August 1 to September 26, 2021. ClariS performed the second season's opening theme song , while TrySail performed the second season's ending theme song "Lapis".

The third and final season, titled , was originally set to premiere at the end of 2021, but was delayed due to production issues. It aired on April 3, 2022, with all four episodes airing back-to-back. ClariS and TrySail performed the third season's ending theme song .

Notes

References

External links
 Official website 
 Official website 
 Official anime website 
 Official anime website 
 Official stage play website at Nelke Planning
 

2017 video games
2018 manga
2022 anime television series debuts
Android (operating system) games
Aniplex franchises
Apocalyptic anime and manga
Gacha games
Houbunsha manga
IOS games
Magical girl anime and manga
Magical girl video games
Manga based on video games
Psychological thriller anime and manga
Puella Magi Madoka Magica
Seinen manga
Shaft (company)
Video games developed in Japan
Yen Press titles